Aminevo (Ämin) is a rural locality (a village) in Baykibashevsky Selsoviet, Karaidelsky District, Bashkortostan, Russia. The population was 100 as of 2010. There are 2 streets.

Geography 
Aminevo is located 21 km west of Karaidel (the district's administrative centre) by road. Bazilevsky is the nearest rural locality.

References 

Rural localities in Karaidelsky District